Edward Wynter (born 1560) was an English sailor, landowner and politician who sat in the House of Commons at various times between 1587 and 1601.

Wynter was the son of admiral Sir William Wynter. He matriculated at Brasenose College, Oxford on 20 December 1577, aged 17 and was awarded BA on 28 January 1579. He was a student of the Inner Temple in 1579. In 1587, he was elected Member of Parliament for Newport. 
 
In  August 1588, Wynter served  on board his father's ship against the Spanish Armada. He was elected MP for  Gloucestershire in 1589. He was knighted in 1595 and was High Sheriff of Gloucestershire in  1598. On 19 January 1601, he became Constable of St. Briavel's Castle and Keeper of the Forest of Dean on the death of the 2nd Earl of Pembroke.  He was elected MP for Gloucestershire again in 1601. On 10 January 1609, he surrendered his posts as constable and keeper to the 3rd Earl of Pembroke. He began making iron in the Forest of Dean and purchased wood from the Crown in 1611 to do so, but this led to several disputes  with the Commoners of the Forest, who were concerned  that they would have no wood left for their own use.

Wynter probably died before 15 March 1627, when his son, Sir John Wynter paid for 4000 cords of wood to be felled in the Forest of Dean.

Wynter married Lady Anne Somerset daughter  of Edward Somerset, Earl of Worcester, on 11 August 1595.

References

 

1560 births
Year of death missing
Alumni of Brasenose College, Oxford
Members of the Inner Temple
High Sheriffs of Gloucestershire
English MPs 1586–1587
English MPs 1589
English MPs 1601